The Ecology Center is a non-profit organization based in Berkeley, California to provide environmental education and reduce the ecological footprint of urban residents.

Programs

California Alliance of Farmers' Markets
The Ecology Center coordinates the California Alliance of Farmers’ Markets, a newly formed coalition of farmers’ markets from around the state of California, committed to working together for the betterment of the farmers' market industry.

Climate Action Coalition
The Ecology Center coordinates the Berkeley Climate Action Coalition (BCAC), a strong and growing network of local organizations and community members joining together to help implement the City of Berkeley’s ambitious, forty-year Climate Action Plan. The BCAC includes residents, non-profits, the City of Berkeley, neighborhood groups, faith based organizations, schools, businesses, UC Berkeley, and others.

Curbside Recycling
Ecology Center launched the first curbside recycling program in the nation in 1973.  The Ecology Center has since contracted with the City of Berkeley to continue to provide curbside recycling service to residents.

EcoHouse
EcoHouse is a demonstration home and garden located in a North Berkeley residential neighborhood. Classes, workshops, and tours of the house and garden are designed to teach people from all walks of life how to make their living spaces healthier, more productive, energy and water efficient, and ecologically friendly. EcoHouse demonstrates ecological ways of living that are accessible and affordable to people of all ages, ethnic/racial backgrounds, and income levels.

Farmers' Markets
The Ecology Center runs the Downtown Berkeley, South Berkeley, and North Berkeley farmers' markets. The North Berkeley market offers 100% organic products, with the other markets focusing primarily on organics, with all of them having imposed a ban on GMOs. The markets host local farmers, many of these small family farms, and food artisans from the greater San Francisco Bay Area, all year round. Frequent shoppers include local restaurants and different houses of the Berkeley Student Cooperative.

Farm Fresh Choice Stands
Farm Fresh Choice is the Ecology Center’s food justice program that engages low-income East Bay residents in reclaiming their optimal health through youth empowerment, nutrition education, and weekly produce stands. We make fresh, organic, regionally grown, and culturally appropriate foods convenient and affordable. Adult mentors and teen leaders facilitate peer-education workshops that raise critical health awareness.

Hotline and Help Desk
The Ecology Center provides information on a wide range of environmental issues from toxics to composting to activism. Staff are available to answer questions over the phone, via e-mail, or on a walk-in basis. Staff handle questions on a wide range of issues. If unable to answer a question, the Ecology Center can make a referral.

Market Match
Market Match is California’s healthy food incentive program, which matches customers’ federal nutrition assistance benefits, like CalFresh and WIC, at farmers’ markets. The program empowers low-income customers to make healthy food choices and benefits hundreds of small and mid-size California farmers. Led by the Ecology Center, it is offered at more than 250 farmers’ markets across the state, in collaboration with 30 regional community-based organizations and farmers’ market operators.

Store
The Ecology Center operates a retail store specializing in recycled goods and other items that encourage environmentally and socially responsible lifestyle practices.

Youth Environmental Academy
The Ecology Center’s Youth Environmental Academy (YEA) is a green leadership development program for young people ages 14–22. YEA provides structured, paid internships to youth at our headquarters in West Berkeley.
Through programming based on the nationally acclaimed Roots of Success curriculum, youth emerge with content knowledge across the following areas: 1) Health, Food Systems, Food Justice, and Sustainable Agriculture, 2) Alternative Energy, 3) Climate Change, 4) Water Conservation, and 5) Waste Management and Recycling.

References

External links
Ecology Center - official website

Climate change organizations based in the United States
Environmental organizations based in the San Francisco Bay Area
Organizations based in Berkeley, California
Food markets in the United States